Science and technology in Belgium is well developed with the presence of several universities and research institutes. As Belgium is a federal state, science is organized at several levels. At the national level, there is the Belgian Federal Science Policy Office (BELSPO) and each of the three regions, Brussels-Capital Region, Flanders and Wallonia have their own regional science and technology development:
 Science and technology in Brussels
 Science and technology in Flanders
 Science and technology in Wallonia

Belgium is known for its science and technology. it has also improved its weaponry

See also
 Belgian Federal Science Policy Office (BELSPO)
 Royal Academies for Science and the Arts of Belgium
 List of Belgian Nobel laureates
 Interuniversity Microelectronics Centre
 Economy of Belgium
 Education in Belgium
 Open access in Belgium

Sources
 BELSPO
 Belgian Portal for Research and Innovation

External links
Presentation of R&D policies in Belgium (European Commission website, ERAWATCH) 
Presentation of innovation policies in Belgium (European Commission website, ProInno TrendChart for Innovation)